Cyo Camp is a residential summer camp located in Brown County Indiana. It is operated by the Catholic Youth Organization and offers 8 one-week sessions for children during the summer.

History 

The original  of land where Camp Rancho Framasa is located was donated by Bert Dingley in 1946. Dingley was the first champion of the organization that would later become Indy Car Racing. Dingley donated the land to the Catholic Archdiocese of Indianapolis to be used as a summer camp for the youth of the Church. His one stipulation was that the camp be named Rancho Framasa. He created the word Framasa by combining the first two letters of his daughters names. (FRAncis, MArgaret, and SAmuela.) All three are still living and attended the camp's 60th anniversary celebration at the Indianapolis Colts Complex in 2006. Portions of the camp also were a part of the original army installation Camp Atterbury. The old dining hall is a remnant of these days. It was built to be able to withstand the tanks which were tested in the surrounding hills. Old tank parts can still be found on occasion.

The past 20 years by Kevin Sullivan. The camp has received multiple grants from the Eli Lilly Foundation to improve the grounds.  The camp now serves 250 children each week of the summer session. Activities include horseback riding, rock climbing, swimming, canoeing, campouts, handicrafts, drama, nature, and archery among others. The camp also is host to many groups during the rest of the year. From retreats, to the local hiking club, the camp is busy year round.

Inclusive Philosophy: CYO Camp is known for its inclusive philosophy. The camp believes that all children should have the opportunity to have a chance to experience camp. These efforts have been well documented through state and national awards from The Arc, Inc. as well as being one of the camps chosen to be a part of the National Inclusive Camping Practices Study. The camp is also only a handful of camps included in the book "Including Youth with Disabilities in Outdoor Programs". This book was one of the first to be written about the practice of inclusion in the outdoor recreation setting.

Rancho Framasa continues to be well known in camping circles through its continued efforts to allow children to experience nature first hand. 

The camp has also been the site of an archaeological dig and the exhumed materials are now on display at an Indiana University Museum.

Famous Alumni Counselors 
Kenneth "Babyface" Edmonds was working at Rancho Framasa as the archery counselor when he received his break. Proof of this is seen through an interview he had on The Arsenio Hall Show in the early 1990s when he talked about his experiences working at the camp.

References

Sources 
 http://www.thefreelibrary.com/INCLUSIVE+PROGRAMMING+AT+SUMMER+CAMP-a075563111 (Parks and Recreation Magazine)
 http://www.ncpad.org/get/discover/about.html
 http://pm.web-pros.com/newsroom/newsreleases/releases.cfm?release=042506.txt (Peyback Foundation)
 https://web.archive.org/web/20070806071517/http://www.catholicexplorer.com/explore4325/nationworld/doing-what-used-to-come-naturally-getting-kids-to-.shtml
National Arc Boggs/Mitchell Award: https://web.archive.org/web/20060210023047/http://arcind.org/PDF%20Files/arc%20news%20wntr%2003%20web.pdf
 http://www.ourbrowncounty.com/0102s5.htm
 http://www.indianamilitary.org/Camp%20Atterbury/History/history_of_camp_atterbury.htm

Rancho Framasa